Bread and Wine: An Erotic Tale of New York (also stylized as Bread & Wine) is a 1999 American graphic novel written by Samuel R. Delany with art by Mia Wolff. The book was reprinted by Fantagraphics Books in 2013 with an interview with Delany and Wolff. The introduction was written by Alan Moore.

Plot
An autobiographical graphic novel about a gay science-fiction writer meeting a homeless man who becomes his partner.

References

External links
Bread and Wine at Fantagraphics Books

Erotic comics
1999 graphic novels
English-language novels
Novels by Samuel Delany
Autobiographical comics
American graphic novels
1990s LGBT novels
LGBT-related graphic novels
American LGBT novels
Novels set in New York City
LGBT literature in the United States